The Cañadón Calcáreo Formation is an Oxfordian to Kimmeridgian-aged geologic formation, from the Cañadón Asfalto Basin in Chubut Province, Argentina, a rift basin that started forming since the earliest Jurassic. It was formerly thought to date into the Cretaceous, but the age has been revised with Uranium Lead dating as likely being solely Late Jurassic in age.

It is a subunit of the Sierra de Olte Group, close to the city Cerro Condor in the Chubut Province of northwestern Patagonia, in southern Argentina. The formation is composed primarily of fluvial sandstones alongside shales and volcanic tuffites

The formation preserves fishes, crocodylomorphs and some dinosaur taxa, as well as conifers.

Geology 
The Cañadón Calcáreo Formation is composed mainly of fluvial deposits, that are found close to the Cañadón Asfalto Formation. While originally thought to be part of the Cañadón Asfalto, there is a lack of calcareous rocks, and the geologic faulting and folding is weaker. The Cañadón Calcáreo Formation is overlain by the Chubut Group, the rocks of which lack synsedimentary deformation. The area of the Cañadón Calcáreo also includes lacustrine and palustrine rocks, including shales, pelites, psammites and coarse clastics.

Age 
The age of the Cañadón Calcáreo Formation was originally presumed to be Late Jurassic, probably Kimmeridgian to Tithonian in age. However, it has also been suggested to span the entire Late Jurassic, beginning in the Oxfordian, although this could also be because of the uncertainty of the youngest age Cañadón Asfalto Formation. A 2009 study of the palynology from a section of the formation revealed an age that was Hauterivian, which suggests that the formation extends from the Late Jurassic into the Early Cretaceous.

Dinosaurs 
An unnamed titanosauriform sauropod is also known from the Cañadón Calcáreo Formation. It is known from a single humerus.

Abelisaurid theropods and a stegosaur are also known from the formation.

Crocodylomorphs

Fishes

Plants

See also 
 List of dinosaur-bearing rock formations
 Lotena Formation, contemporaneous formation of the Neuquén Basin
 Los Molles Formation, contemporaneous formation of the Neuquén Basin

References

Bibliography

Further reading 

 O. W. M. Rauhut, J. L. Carballido, and D. Pol. 2015. A diplodocid sauropod dinosaur from the Late Jurassic Cañadón Calcáreo Formation of Chubut, Argentina. Journal of Vertebrate Paleontology 35(5):e982798:1-8
 O. W. M. Rauhut, K. Remes, R. Fechner, G. Cladera, and P. Puerta. 2005. Discovery of a short-necked sauropod dinosaur from the Late Jurassic period of Patagonia. Nature 435:670-672
 T. H. Rich, O. Giménez, R. Cúneo, P. F. Puerta, R. Vacca and P. A. Vickers-Rich. 1997. Primer registro de un camarasáurido primitivo en el Gondwana patagónico [First record of a primitive camarasaurid in Patagonian Gondwana]. Ameghiniana 34(4):540

Geologic formations of Argentina
Jurassic System of South America
Late Jurassic South America
Jurassic Argentina
Kimmeridgian Stage
Oxfordian Stage
Tithonian Stage
Sandstone formations
Tuff formations
Fluvial deposits
Lacustrine deposits
Formations
Fossiliferous stratigraphic units of South America
Mesozoic paleontological sites of South America
Jurassic paleontological sites
Paleontology in Argentina
Geology of Chubut Province